The McKameys are a professional Southern gospel group based in Clinton, Tennessee. Current members are Ruben and Peg Bean, Sheryl Farris, Connie Fortner, Roger Fortner, and Eli Fortner.
On November 23, 2019 the McKameys played their last concert in Knoxville, Tennessee.
On average, the McKameys play approximately 150 bookings annually throughout the United States and Canada. With 16 No. 1 singles, the group was honored by Horizon Records in 1999 for having the most No. 1 hits in the history of Southern Gospel music. The McKameys also hold the record for having the most No. 1 songs on Singing News magazine's charts.

Group history

The group first organized in 1954 as a trio of sisters: Dora, Peg, and Carol McKamey. As their father was a Christian minister, the girls grew up singing in church. One day Dora announced to her astonished sisters that they were going to sing with her in church the next Sunday as a trio. 

"She gathered us up in her kitchen, started singing and we each found our parts," Peg explained. "We just thought we were gonna sing that one time, in her home church, but different people heard us and invited us to sing at their church or at revivals. Then out of town evangelists heard us at the revivals and invited us to come to their church and we started traveling to Florida and Indiana and Ohio, and that's how it all started."

In 1957, Ruben Bean started playing guitar for the trio, and he and Peg married two years later. While their daughters, Connie and Sheryl, were growing up they traveled with their mom, dad and aunts when the group was on the road. After Dora and Carol retired from the trio in 1972, Connie and Sheryl stepped in to take over their parts. 

In the mid 1980s, Sheryl left the group to join her husband as a pastor's wife. At that time, Carol returned to the group, now made up of Peg, Connie, Ruben and Carol with Roger Fortner playing guitar. From late 1988 until mid-1989, Bonnie White replaced Carol until she ultimately returned to the group. 

The vocal lineup of Connie, Peg, Carol, and Ruben would perform together until April 2009 when Carol Woodard officially retired from full-time travel. Sheryl Farris returned to replace Carol. Since returning, Sheryl & Connie have traded the lead vocal for a change in the vocal lineup for standards like "The Shepherd's Point of View" and "When He Speaks" and "A Hill Worth Dying On". 

In 2007, Eli Fortner joined his parents, Roger and Connie, on stage full-time as a guitarist and featured vocalist. Eli's solos appear on every project since their 2005 release, The Old Path. In 2012, Roger Fortner stepped up to sing a solo, "Unspoken Request". Much to the delight of fans, Roger's first solo captured the No. 1 spot on the January 2013 Singing News Top 80 Charts and received nominations for Song of the Year in the 2013 Singing News Fan Awards and 2013 NQC Music Awards.

Currently, all members of the McKameys perform at least one song during each program. Whether it is a mixed trio, mixed quartet, or male trio, the McKameys perform a variety of their classics combined with fresh favorites.

In September 2018, The McKameys announced on singingnews.com in an open letter that November of 2019 would be the end of their full-time touring.  

In February 2021, Roger, Connie and Eli Fortner announced they would be performing as McKamey Legacy.

Discography

1968: The Family Prayer
1969: What a Day That Will Be
1970: Jesus is Coming Soon
1970: You've Gotta Live Like Jesus
1971: The Old Rugged Cross Made the Difference
1972: Hold to God's Unchanging Hand (Trail)
1973: Let Me Walk With You Jesus (Trail)
1974: Joy in the Morning (Trail)
1975: We Love Him Too Much (To Fail Him Now) (Trail)
1976: On Business for the King (Trail)
1977: Lord I Know How Much You Love Me (Trail)
1978: On the Way Up (Trail)
1979: At Home (Night Watch)
1980: Live (Night Watch)
1981: Genuine (Night Watch)
1981: He Didn't Let Us Down (MorningStar)
1982: By Faith (MorningStar)
1983: Keepsake (MorningStar)
1984: Tennessee Live! (MorningStar)
1985: Fruitful (MorningStar)
1986: Unique (MorningStar)
1987: More Than Music (MorningStar)
1987: Christmas (MorningStar)
1988: Covered by Love (Morning Star)
1988: Gone to Meetin' Live (MorningStar)
1989: Sing Praises (MorningStar)
1990: Purpose (MorningStar)
1991: Just Thinking (MorningStar)
1992: Visions (compilation) (MorningStar)
1992: With Feeling Live (Horizon)
1993: With His Power (Horizon)
1994: It's Real (Horizon)
1995: Sheltered (Horizon)
1995: Gifts (Horizon)
1997: Still Have a Song (Horizon)
1998: Remembrance (Horizon)
1998: Always (Horizon)
2000: Waiting (Horizon)
2001: I've Won (Horizon)
2002: Trophy of Grace (Horizon)
2003: An Acoustic Journey (Horizon)
2004: Fresh Manna (Horizon)
2005: The Old Path (Horizon)
2007: Telling the Story (Horizon)
2008: Something More (Horizon)
2009: The Message (Horizon)
2011: Joy in the Journey (Horizon)
2012: Precious Seed (Horizon)
2013: A Song Every Day (Horizon)
2014: 50 (Horizon) The fiftieth recording by The McKameys
2015: What If (Horizon)
2016: Something Worth Saving (Horizon)
2017: Be Brave (Horizon)
2019: The Crown (Horizon)
2020: Live Like No Other

"Burning the Midnight Oil" (No. 19)
1984: "Who Put the Tears (In the Eyes of the Lamb?)" (No. 1)
"Somebody Prayed for Me"
"Tarry Here" (No. 4)
"Bring Me out of the Desert" (No. 5)
"The Bride Coming In" (No. 4)
"I'm Going Through" (No. 10)
1987: "Getting Used to the Dark" (No. 1)
"No More Sea" (No. 12)
1988: "God on the Mountain" (No. 1)
"Ground Breaking" (No. 10)
"Under His Feet" (No. 2)
1991: "God Will Make This Trial a Blessing" (No. 1)
"Handfuls of Purpose" (No. 16)
"Somehow He Will" (No. 27)
"The Rising of the Son" (No. 5)
"Vision of Heaven" (No. 35)
1993: "Do You Know How It Feels?" (No. 1)
1993: "A Borrowed Tomb" (No. 1)
1994: "Arise" (No. 1)
"Prayer Changes Me" (No. 2)
"I'm Going Through, Jesus" (No. 3)
"A Voice Within" (No. 6)
"How Deep Is the Sea?" (No. 3)
"The Old Love Letter" (No. 3)
1997: "Right on Time" (No. 1)
"This Valley Is for Me" (No. 3)
"A Wall of Prayer" (No. 3)
1999: "Roll That Burden on Me" (No. 1)
"It Satisfies Me" (No. 4)
"The Blood" (No. 3)
"Even the Valley" (No. 4)
2001: "I've Won" (No. 1)
2002: "He Calms Me" (No. 1)
2002: "I Keep Praying" (No. 1)
"The Other Side" (No. 2)
"Surely Goodness and the Mercies of the Lord" (No. 4)
"A Trophy of Grace" (No. 5)
"Anytime" (No. 7)
"God Is So Good to Me" (No. 2)
2005: "The Good News" (No. 1)
2005: "I Am Home" (No. 1)
2006: "I Will Trust You, Lord" (No. 1)
"Altogether Lovely" (No. 2)
"You're Still God" (No. 4)
"You Are with Me" (No. 3)
"It Takes Time" (No. 32)
"I've Made up My Mind" (No. 9)
2009: "Between Twelve and Thirty-Three" (No. 1)
2010: "The Shepherd's Point of View" (No. 1)
2011: "Above and Beyond" (No. 1)
"When Faith Steps In" (No. 4)
"I Made It by Grace" (No. 4)
2013: "Unspoken Request" (No. 1)
"When He Speaks" (No. 3)
"Hold On" (No. 11)
"A Hill Worth Dying On" (No. 4)
"There Is Jesus"

1988: Gone To Meetin’
1989: Sing Praises
1991: On Tour 
1992: With Feeling, Live!
1994: With His Power 
1996: Encourage 
1999: Genuine
2000: Who We Are 
2001: Hometown Live!
2003: Renfro Valley Live'
2006: The Old Path Live2006: Christmas2008: Something More Live2011: JourneyAwards
1989: Female Vocalist of the Year - Peg McKamey Bean
1989: Song of the Year - "God on the Mountain" (Tracy Dartt)
1990: Female Vocalist of the Year - Peg McKamey Bean
1991: Female Vocalist of the Year - Peg McKamey Bean
1992: Female Vocalist of the Year - Peg McKamey Bean
1993: Female Vocalist of the Year - Peg McKamey Bean
1994: Female Vocalist of the Year - Peg McKamey Bean
1994: Song of the Year - "Arise" (Roger Ealey)
2001: Marvin Norcross Award - Ruben Bean
2002: Female Vocalist of the Year - Peg McKamey Bean
2003: Video of the Year - Hometown Live!''
2012: Norcross-Templeton Award - Peg McKamey Bean
2016: Southern Gospel Museum and Hall of Fame Inductee - Peg McKamey Bean

References

Southern gospel performers
American gospel musical groups
Crossroads Music
Families from Tennessee
Musical groups from Tennessee
People from Clinton, Tennessee
Musical groups established in 1954